Rosas (or Las Rosas) is an administrative neighborhood of Madrid belonging to the district of San Blas-Canillejas.

It comprises part of the Ensanche Este de San Blas, to the west of the M-40 as well as large non-urbanised plots to the east of the latter motorway, including a sepiolite extraction site, whose mining below the phreatic level has induced the formation of a series of small lagoons. The former athletics stadium known as La Peineta (currently the Metropolitano Stadium, the home football stadium of Atlético Madrid) is located in the neighborhood.

As of 1 March 2020, it has a population of 31,953.

References 

Wards of Madrid
San Blas-Canillejas